Cheng Yu is a Chinese musician, known as a performer of the pipa, a Chinese four-stringed lute,

She gained a BMus in China and an MMus in the United Kingdom. She completed her PhD studies at the School of Oriental and African Studies (SOAS) in London on Ancient Xi'an Music.

She plays, records and researches on traditional and contemporary Chinese music as well as cross-cultural music collaborations in the UK, Europe and other places. In 2005, she re-created a modern version of the lost Tang Dynasty five-stringed pipa, based on the study of old Tang dynasty pipas and lutes from the East Asian cultures.

She is one of the founding members of the UK Chinese Ensemble (established in 1998) and of the London Youlan Qin Society (inaugurated in 2003).

Biography
Cheng Yu was born in Beijing, but grew up in Gansu Province in Northwest China when her family was exiled during the Cultural Revolution. She studied the southern Pudong style of pipa with her father from the age of seven and was further trained by pipa masters in the north-western Pinghu style later. She also studied and graduated with distinction in the Xi'an Conservatory of Music in 1987 for the guqin. She won the "outstanding pipa player" award in China in the same year she was selected as a pipa soloist in the China Central Orchestra of Chinese Music in Beijing.

Collaborations and projects
Asian Music Circuit: Chinese Music Summer School from 2003
ARC Music
SOAS
Music House
Zomba
Extreme Music
Realworld
Damon Albarn
Monkey: Journey to the West
Tan Dun
Chen Yi
Xu Yi
Barrington Pheloung
Randy Edelman
Karl Jenkins
Trevor Jones
Fabien Tehericsen
London Sinfonietta 1996
Lyon Ensemble Orchestral Contemporian 2000-01
Avignon Orchestra 2003
Edinburgh String Quartet 2004
Youth Music: Faber Music Songbook 2005
Jan Kuiper
Purbayan Chatterjee
Zoumana Kiarra
Jan Hendrickse
Tim Garside
Stephen Dydo
Gillian Carcas
Gyewon Byeon

References

External links
Cheng Yu Information on the website of the UK Chinese Ensemble

Year of birth missing (living people)
Living people
Alumni of SOAS University of London
Chinese emigrants to England
People's Republic of China musicians
Pipa players
Place of birth missing (living people)
Musicians from Beijing